The Syro-Malabar Catholic Eparchy (Diocese) of Sagar is an eparchy (Eastern Catholic diocese) in central India, which is part of the Syro-Malabar Catholic Church (Chaldean or Syro-Oriental Rite, led by the Major Archbishop of Ernakulam-Angamaly, under the Roman Congregation for the Oriental Churches), yet is a suffragan in the ecclesiastical province of the Latin Catholic rite Metropolitan of the Roman (Latin Catholic) Archdiocese of Bhopal. It was created in 1968 as (missionary) and promoted diocese in 1977 by the papal bull Divina Verba of Pope Paul VI.

Its cathedral episcopal see is St. Theresa’s Cathedral, in Saga(u)r.

History 
The future eparchy (diocese) of Sagar was erected as an apostolic exarchate (pre-diocesan missionary Eastern Catholic jurisdiction) by the papal bull Quo Aptius dated 29 July 1968, cutting out previously Latin rite territory from the Archdiocese of Bhopal the civil districts of Sagar, Raisen and Vidisha in Madhya Pradesh state. Again at the request of the Bishop of Ajmer-Jaipur, the district of Guna was added to the Exarchate of Sagar by the papal decree De Bono Animarum on 2 April 1973. The civil district of Guna was further bifurcated on 15 August 2003 to form the district of Ashoknagar. 

The Holy See by its decree Divina Verba on 26 February 1977 raised the apostolic exarchate to the status of a proper eparchy (diocese). The exarch Clemens Thottungal CMI was promoted the first bishop of the eparchy. Mar Joseph Pastor Neelankavil CMI succeeded him as second bishop of the eparchy. After his retirement in 2006, Mar Anthony Chirayath was appointed bishop of the eparchy. Mar James Athikalam MST was ordained bishop of Sagar on 17 April 2018.

Statistics and organization 
As per 2015, the eparchy of Sagar, covering five civil districts in Madhya Pradesh (Sagar, Raisen, Vidisha, Guna and Ashoknagar), pastorally served 3,443 Catholics (0.1% of 5,311,000 total, about half of the Christians) on 39,020 km2, in 44 parishes and 36 missions with 79 priests (58 diocesan, 21 religious), 295 lay religious (29 brothers, 266 sisters) and 17 seminarians. 

The area is rather underdeveloped due to various social, economic and cultural reasons. Eighty-five per cent of the people are farmers or farm-workers. The labour is not well organised, and consequently a lot of exploitation prevails. Eighty per cent of the people are Hindus belonging to various castes and the rest are Muslims, Jains, Sikhs, Adivasis and a very small minority of Christians. The various Socio-Pastoral, Medical and Educational apostolates of the Church are being carried out in the eparchy under the Sagar Diocesan Service Society (SDSS), which is registered under the M.P. Government Firms and Societies Registration Act. For better coordination and management, the social work apostolate of the diocese is being carried out by Manav Vikas Seva Sangh (MVSS). There are also St. Francis Society (SFS) and Pushpa Service Society (PSS). All of these societies are registered under the M.P. Government Firms and Societies Registration Act.
 
Through various pastoral activities, the missionaries take care of the spiritual needs of the Catholics and other Gospel proclaiming programmes. There are many developmental programmes by which poor farmers and poverty-stricken people are helped. Missionaries in Sagar have always tried to venture into new areas of apostolate according to the need.

Ordinaries 
(all Indians and Syro-Malabar Rite)

 Apostolic Exarch of Sagar
 Father Clement Thottungal, Carmelites of Mary Immmaculate (C.M.I.) (1968.07.29 – 1977.02.26 see below: see promoted)

 Suffragan Bishops of Sagar
 Mar Clemens Thottunkal (see above promotion 1977.02.26 – retired 1986.12.20), died 1991
 Mar Joseph Pastor Neelankavil, C.M.I. (1986.12.20 – retired 2006.02.02)
 Mar Anthony Chirayath (2006.02.02 – retired 2018.01.12), first secular incumbent. He was born on 30 July 1941 in Tharayil branch of Chirayath patriarchal family at Aranattukara in the Syro-Malabar Catholic Archdiocese of Thrissur to Mathew and Anna as the fifth of six children. On 5 August 1941 he was baptised at St. Mary’s Church, Aranattukara. As a young boy he was active in the parish activities. He was an altar server, member of the Sodality of the Blessed Virgin Mary and the Society of St. Vincent de Paul. He did his primary and secondary schooling at Tharakan’s High School, Aranattukara. On 8 July 1951 he received the Sacrament of Confirmation from Bishop George Alappat of Trichur at St. Mary’s Monastery chapel, Elthuruth. In 1958 he completed his high school from St. Aloysius High School, Elthuruth. The next two years were spent in St. Augustine's Minor Seminary, Jabalpur. In 1961 he passed Intermediate Exams from Jabalpur University. In 1964 he graduated with first rank in political science from Nagpur University. It was at St. Charles Seminary, Nagpur that he did his philosophy and theology studies. In 1969 he represented the seminary at the Post-Conciliar Assembly held in Bangalore in 1969. On 2 January 1970 he was ordained priest for Sagar eparchy, together with his brother Fr. Jose Chirayath, CMI at Devmatha Provincial House Chapel at Trichur by Mar George Alappat. In the same year he obtained B.Th. The next two years he was active in Sagar as Secretary of Mar Clemens Thottungal, CMI, Chancellor of the Eparchy, Parish Priest of the cathedral, Sagar University Chaplain and Diocesan Director of Social Services. In 1972, he was selected to serve in the Roman Curia. From 1972 he was an Official of the Pontifical Council for the Pastoral Care of Migrants and Itinerant People. In 1978 he was given the title of Papal Chamberlain. In 1994 he was made a Prelate of Honour. In 2003 Pope John Paul II elevated him as Office Head. In the same year he was honoured with the title of Apostolic Proto-notary. On 2 February 2006 Pope Benedict XVI elected him third Bishop of Sagar. On 25 March 2006 he was ordained Bishop by Varkey Cardinal Vithayathil, Major Archbishop of the Syro-Malabar Church. Archbishop Jacob Thoomkuzhy of Trichur and Bishop Joseph Pastor Neelankavil, CMI, Bishop Emeritus of Sagar, were co-consecrators. Bishop Chirayath speaks several Indian and European languages. He has travelled widely representing his Office and the Holy See at several international and national meetings.
 Mar James Athikalam, Missionary Society of Saint Thomas (M.S.T.) (2018.01.12 – ...).

Sources and External links
 Official Website:
 GCatholic
 Official Blog:
 Manav Vikas Seva Sang:
 St. Francis Society:

Eastern Catholic dioceses in India
Syro-Malabar Catholic dioceses
Syro-Malabar Catholic Diocese of Sagar
Roman Catholic dioceses and prelatures established in the 20th century
Christianity in Madhya Pradesh
1968 establishments in Madhya Pradesh